Tsuno may refer to:
Tsuno, Kōchi, a town in Kōchi Prefecture
Tsuno, Miyazaki, a city in Miyazaki Prefecture
Tsuno District, Yamaguchi, a former district in Yamaguchi Prefecture